In Greek mythology, Actis (Ancient Greek: Ἀκτίς) was one of the Heliadae, a son of Rhodos  and Helios. Actis, along with his brothers, Triopas, Macar, and Candalus, were jealous of a fifth brother, Tenages's, skill at science. They killed him and Actis escaped to Egypt. According to Diodorus Siculus, Actis built the city of Heliopolis in Egypt to honour his father Helios, and it was from Actis that the Egyptians learned astrology.

Notes

References 

 Diodorus Siculus, The Library of History translated by Charles Henry Oldfather. Twelve volumes. Loeb Classical Library. Cambridge, Massachusetts: Harvard University Press; London: William Heinemann, Ltd. 1989. Vol. 3. Books 4.59–8. Online version at Bill Thayer's Web Site
 Diodorus Siculus, Bibliotheca Historica. Vol 1-2. Immanel Bekker. Ludwig Dindorf. Friedrich Vogel. in aedibus B. G. Teubneri. Leipzig. 1888–1890. Greek text available at the Perseus Digital Library.

Children of Helios
Demigods in classical mythology
Rhodian characters in Greek mythology